Westhausen is a municipality in the district of Ostalbkreis in Baden-Württemberg (Germany).

References

Ostalbkreis
Württemberg